Augustine Joung Kang (October 8, 1923 – August 22, 2009) is a recipient of the Ramon Magsaysay Award for his practical democracy and use of regional cooperation to foster economically and humanly sound credit unions.

References

1923 births
2009 deaths
Ramon Magsaysay Award winners